The Conroy Tri-Turbo-Three was a Douglas DC-3 fitted with three Pratt & Whitney Canada PT6A turboprop engines by Conroy Aircraft; the third engine was mounted on the nose of the aircraft.

Design and development
It was used by Polair and Maritime Patrol and Rescue. It was fitted with skis for use in polar regions and flew in the North Pole region out of Resolute Bay Airport in Canada. It was uniquely suited for flying long distances and landing on rough, unprepared snow runways.

In this role it was instrumental in opening up the interior of Antarctica to private expeditions and tourism. Most notable was a 1983 expedition transporting eight members of the Seven Summits expedition, plus a crew of three, to the Antarctic for a first-ever assault on Mount Vinson.

In early May 1986 workers at the Santa Barbara Municipal Airport accidentally started a fire in the cockpit of this aircraft, which destroyed the cockpit. A second Tri-Turbo-Three was then manufactured out of the wreckage of the old plane and a different airframe.

Specifications

See also

References

 "Airdata File: Specialized Aircraft Tri Turbo-3". Air International, November 1978, Vol 15 No 5. p. 252.
 Gunston, Bill. The Illustrated Encyclopedia of Propeller Airliners. London: Windward/Phoebus, 1980. .

External links

 Tri-Turbo 3 Goleta Air and Space Museum

1970s United States airliners
Tri-Turbo-Three
Trimotors
Low-wing aircraft
Three-engined turboprop aircraft
Douglas DC-3
Aircraft first flown in 1977